Xihu Wetland is a wetland in Houlong Township, Miaoli County, Taiwan.

History
In 2009, bicycle path and a windmill was constructed at the wetland area.

Geology
The wetland spans over an area of 142 hectares. It is managed by Miaoli County Government.

Transportation
The wetland is accessible within walking distance north of Longgang Station of Taiwan Railways Administration.

See also
 List of tourist attractions in Taiwan

References

Landforms of Miaoli County
Wetlands of Taiwan